Professor Nicola Steedman is the Scottish Deputy Chief Medical Officer.

Life
Steedman was born and brought up in Ireland and she went to Cambridge and Oxford University. She went on to do medical training in Oxford.

In 2012 she returned to Scotland to work for the Scottish Government as Senior Medical Officer. She calls Scotland her "spiritual home" and she returned after four years working as a consultant in Sexual Health and HIV at Chester and as an honorary lecturer at the University of Liverpool.

In 2017 she first began to work for National Services Scotland (NSS) part time in the Information Services Division where she worked as the National Clinical Lead for Maternity and Reproductive Health Data.

In June 2019 she started work again for NSS as Medical Director for Procurement, Commissioning and Facilities.

Near the start of the COVID-19 pandemic in Scotland she was asked to return again as the Deputy Chief Medical Officer. The vacancy appeared suddenly as Gregor Smith stepped from the Deputy position to be the acting Chief Medical Officer as his boss had resigned after breaking lockdown rules. Steedman was brought in by Jeane Freeman to take over the Deputy role.

Gregor Smith who had been "acting" was confirmed as Scotland's Chief Medical Officer at the end of 2020.

In 2021 she was still working as Scotland's Deputy Chief Medical Officer partnering Nicola Sturgeon giving briefings on the continuing restrictions of the COVID-19 pandemic. She was briefing the press on progress - in July 2021 she was noting that the majority of the people being admitted to hospital in Scotland with Coronavirus were those who were unvaccinated.

Positions
Steedman is an Honorary Professor at Glasgow Caledonian University and Honorary Consultant in HIV Medicine at NHS Lothian.

References

Living people
Year of birth missing (living people)
Irish women medical doctors
Alumni of the University of Cambridge
Alumni of the University of Oxford
Irish medical doctors